Scoulerine, also known as discretamine and aequaline, is a benzylisoquinoline alkaloid (BIA) that is derived directly from (S)-reticuline through the action of berberine bridge enzyme. It is a precursor of other BIAs, notably berberine, noscapine, (S)-tetrahydropalmatine, and (S)-stylopine, as well as the alkaloids protopine, and sanguinarine.  It is found in many plants, including opium poppy, Croton flavens, and certain plants in the genus Erythrina. 

Studies show that scoulerine is an antagonist in vitro at the α2-adrenoceptor, α1D-adrenoceptor and 5-HT receptor. It has also been found to be a GABAA receptor agonist in vitro.

References

Isoquinolinoisoquinolines
Natural opium alkaloids
Phenols
Catechol ethers
Methoxy compounds